Dacibyza or Dakibyza, or Dacibyze or Dakibyze (Δακιβύζη), was a town of ancient Bithynia located on the road from Libyssa to Chalcedon on the north coast of the Sinus Astacenus, an arm of the Propontis.

Its site is located near Gebze, in Asiatic Turkey.

References

Populated places in Bithynia
Former populated places in Turkey
History of Kocaeli Province